The tiny tuco-tuco (Ctenomys minutus) is a tuco-tuco species found in Brazil and Bolivia. It is squirrel like with a furry texture.

References

Tuco-tucos
Mammals described in 1887